Sverre Stenersen (18 June 1926 – 17 December 2005) was a Norwegian Nordic combined skier who dominated the event throughout the 1950s. His biggest triumphs were winning individual gold medals at the 1954 World Championships and 1956 Olympics. He also won a bronze at the 1952 Olympics and a silver at the 1958 World Championships. Stenersen won the Nordic combined event at the national championships in 1954–58 and at the Holmenkollen ski festival in 1955, 1956 and 1959. In 1955 he received the Holmenkollen medal, shared with King Haakon VII, Hallgeir Brenden, and Veikko Hakulinen.

Stenersen was born on a small farm in Målselv. In the late 1940s, seeking better training conditions, he moved to the Oslo area and worked there as a lumberjack to earn a living. He retired after placing seventh at the 1960 Winter Olympics and for several years ran a sport store in Målselv. After that he served as secretary for culture and sport in his municipality until retiring by age.

Cross-country skiing results

Olympic Games

World Championships

References

External links

 
 Holmenkollen medalists – click Holmenkollmedaljen for downloadable pdf file 
 Holmenkollen winners since 1892 – click Vinnere for downloadable pdf file 

1926 births
2005 deaths
People from Målselv
Norwegian male cross-country skiers
Norwegian male Nordic combined skiers
Norwegian male ski jumpers
Olympic cross-country skiers of Norway
Olympic Nordic combined skiers of Norway
Olympic ski jumpers of Norway
Cross-country skiers at the 1952 Winter Olympics
Nordic combined skiers at the 1952 Winter Olympics
Nordic combined skiers at the 1956 Winter Olympics
Nordic combined skiers at the 1960 Winter Olympics
Ski jumpers at the 1956 Winter Olympics
Olympic gold medalists for Norway
Olympic bronze medalists for Norway
Holmenkollen medalists
Holmenkollen Ski Festival winners
Olympic medalists in Nordic combined
FIS Nordic World Ski Championships medalists in Nordic combined
Medalists at the 1952 Winter Olympics
Medalists at the 1956 Winter Olympics
Sportspeople from Troms og Finnmark
20th-century Norwegian people